Alfred James Wellbeloved (29 July 1926 – 10 September 2012) was a British politician.

Wellbeloved was educated at South London Technical College and was a commercial and industrial correspondent. He served as a councillor on Erith Borough Council from 1956, and was the first leader of the London Borough of Bexley from 1964.

As MP
He was elected Labour Party Member of Parliament (MP) for Erith and Crayford at a 1965 by-election following the death of Norman Dodds, whose constituency chairman he had been.

In 1970, there was a discussion in the House of Commons as to whether to continue the practice of the rum ration, now known as the "Great Rum Debate". Wellbeloved argued in favor of continuing the practice. He had previously served in the Royal Navy.

Wellbeloved served successively as parliamentary private secretary (PPS) to Defence Minister Gerry Reynolds and Foreign Secretary Michael Stewart, and was also a junior defence minister in the Callaghan government. In 1981, he was among the Labour MPs who defected to the Social Democratic Party.  At the 1983 general election, he lost his seat by just 920 votes to the Conservative David Evennett.

After his defection, he was referred to as "the inappropriately named Wellbeloved" by then Labour leader Michael Foot. Wellbeloved subsequently rejoined the Labour Party as a member.

Personal life
Wellbeloved married Mavis Ratcliff in 1948. Wellbeloved died on 10 September 2012, aged 86.

References

Sources
Times Guide to the House of Commons, 1966 & 1983

1926 births
2012 deaths
Labour Party (UK) MPs for English constituencies
Councillors in the London Borough of Bexley
Social Democratic Party (UK) MPs for English constituencies
UK MPs 1964–1966
UK MPs 1966–1970
UK MPs 1970–1974
UK MPs 1974
UK MPs 1974–1979
UK MPs 1979–1983